KQAD (800 AM) is a radio station broadcasting a Soft AC format. Licensed to Luverne, Minnesota, United States, the station serves the Luverne and Rock Rapids areas. The station is currently owned by Alpha Media out of Portland, Oregon. The station play lite hits from the 1960s to the present. Max Hodgdon hosts the morning show, Matt D is the afternoon host and Jay Kelly is on evenings. The station covers local news from Luverne and Rock Rapids, and covers Luverne Cardinal High School sports.

Founding and early history

In the late 1960s well-known local newspaperman, Al McIntosh, became aware of an application pending at the FCC to locate an AM radio station in Luverne. This application was initiated by the owner of a radio station in York, Nebraska, so McIntosh convinced four other local businessmen, Mort Skewes, Warren Schoon, Rollie Swanson, and Dominic Lippi, to join forces and submit a competing application to the FCC. These two applications were mutually exclusive, and sat in the hands of the FCC for upwards of two years before local stakeholders accelerated the process. In the spring of 1968, Paul Hedberg, an experienced owner of another radio station in southern Minnesota, joined the five businessmen from Luverne, and together they entered negotiations with their competitor to withdraw his application with the FCC. Soon thereafter the FCC granted the six-member ownership group, now organized as Siouxland Broadcasting, the construction permit for KQAD. At its inception KQAD broadcast a pop music format, and was affiliated with the ABC Radio Network.

Six months after the debut of KQAD, its sister station KQAD-FM went on the air. KQAD-FM is now known as KLQL.

References

External links

Radio stations in Minnesota
Mainstream adult contemporary radio stations in the United States
Radio stations established in 1971
1971 establishments in Minnesota